Sylvie Laufeydottir (born Loki) is a fictional character portrayed by Sophia Di Martino in the Marvel Cinematic Universe (MCU) media franchise, partially based on the characters Lady Loki and Sylvie Lushton from the Marvel Comics. She is an alternate version of Loki who helps him fight to overthrow the Time Variance Authority (TVA). She hopes to destroy the TVA and He Who Remains for stealing away her life, viewing herself as an agent of the universe itself. She is later forced to ally with a variant of Loki from 2012, with whom she falls in love.

Di Martino debuted as the character in Loki (2021). Her portrayal was received positively among critics and fans despite initial confusion over her identity. For her performance as Sylvie, Di Martino received several awards and nominations.

Development

Concept and creation 
Sylvie is an original character created for the MCU with inspiration taken from Lady Loki, a female form of the original Loki who debuted in Thor Vol. 2 #80 following the Ragnarok event, and Sylvie Lushton, the second iteration of the Enchantress introduced in Dark Reign: Young Avengers #1. In the comics, Lushton is a girl from Broxton, Oklahoma who receives magical powers granted to her when Asgardians took over her home. Later, she became a temporary member of the Young Avengers and so-called "Goddess of Mischief", a moniker that the show adapted onto Sylvie. Fatherly summed up the character as: "While the comics imply that some version of Loki created Sylvie, they are not the same character. What the Loki series has done is seemingly combined the character of Sylvie and Lady Loki into a new person: a Loki Variant who uses the alias 'Sylvie.'"

Casting 
Di Martino auditioned for the role with Hiddleston under the false names "Bob" and "Sarah", and it wasn't until afterwards that she was told which role she was playing. She was ultimately cast in November 2019 with reports indicating that she was playing a female version of Loki in some shape or form. According to Di Martino, it was important to make the character unique and original while retaining the important aspects of Loki's personality. Herron pitched the character as "a brand new backstory in a brand new story" with her physicality and mannerisms similar to Hiddleston's Loki. Herron wanted Di Martino cast in the role because the way she "has this fire in her and she brings this amazing vulnerability to all her characters," using her to help craft Sylvie as an alternate Loki who can hold her own without taking the attention away from her alternate counterpart. Hiddleston expressed excitement for Di Martino taking the role, commenting: "I cannot wait for audiences to see Sophia in this...she has mischief, playfulness, maybe a little bit of interior fragmentation and some broken emotions...but [she is] so committed and she made it completely her own [with] her own preparation and research and it was such a fun dynamic." Hiddleston furthered his comments by saying: "I think for Loki, it'd be quite destabilizing" at meeting an alternate version of himself.

Characterization 
Creator Michael Waldron's intent with Sylvie was to have her play a role in Loki's self-actualization and redemption from the villainous depiction in previous movies with Waldron commenting that "in meeting Sylvie and having a mirror held up to him, for the first time he feels [affection] about himself...in Sylvie, he sees things to admire in himself." In the show, Sylvie is Loki's love interest, an idea formed in the earliest pitches of the show from Waldron, who wanted his reluctant relationship with her to develop his character in "the hope that maybe that it's also about him learning to forgive himself." Waldron also added: "Sophia is amazing such a tremendous actress… I guess, you know what makes her a great foil for Tom...[is seen throughout]." To misgivings about the romance between Loki and Sylvie, Hiddleston praised that character thread by explaining: "I don't think Loki's relationship with himself has been very healthy...it was satisfying to see him face aspects he's on the run from...also, Sylvie's not Loki. Sylvie is Sylvie. That's interesting, too." Herron also found her being his romantic interest to be unique: "...[there's] kind of fun thing about it. She is him, but she's not him. They've had such different life experiences. So just from an identity perspective, it was interesting to dig into that." She added: "The look that they share, that moment, [it started as] a blossoming friendship. Then for the first time, they both feel that twinge of, 'Oh, could this be something more? What is this I'm feeling?' "

Rachel Paige of Marvel.com defined Sylvie as being "incredibly guarded with tall walls built up around her to protect herself from everything—both physical fights and feelings." The character's arc sought to break down these walls while maintaining a focus on revenge against the TVA trumped all other aspects of her development. Di Martino noted the ultimate sadness of the character in the final moments of the season one finale "For All Time. Always.: "She kills him, she's just completely unfulfilled. It didn't do what she wanted to do...she doesn't feel that relief." According to Herron, Sylvie is driven by revenge, pain, and anger, a counterpart to Loki in Thor (2011). Of her arc in season one, she commented: "Loki tells her, 'You're not going to get what you want.' But she's not there yet. On her journey of self-healing, she's not where he is." Despite this, Herron stated her feelings, captured in the kiss between her and Loki, were genuine but her other feelings overtook it, leading to her betrayal and will to take down the TVA once and for all: "I think she definitely cares about him but I always interpret the kiss as a goodbye. I don't think it's necessarily a complete trick and I don't think her feelings were a trick." Di Martino, commenting on the season one finale, found that "for Sylvie, she's just on a revenge mission" due to "having her life...ruined, [taken away from her], this sort of anger. And if you want to think of it in these terms, her 'glorious purpose'" adding that she is "hell-bent" on her mission throughout the series.

Like Loki, she is bisexual, an aspect Herron and Di Martino found to be important for representation and to honor the Norse mythology of the character. Many news outlets including the Los Angeles Times noted the way this inclusion mimics the comics, finding the detail "a big step for the MCU, which has for years been called out for its abysmal track record when it comes to LGBTQ inclusion".

Fictional character biography

Origins

Similarly to the 2012 variant of Loki, Loki was born a Frost Giant and abandoned as an infant by her father Laufey. While emulating a rescue of Asgard while playing with her toys, Loki is arrested by Ravonna Renslayer (then known as Hunter A-23) on behalf of the TVA as a child for "crimes against the Sacred Timeline". Escaping across time using Renslayer's TemPad, Loki learns to hide herself from the TVA over the following centuries, adopting the alias "Sylvie" while seeking to "free" the Sacred Timeline from the TVA, developing a method of body possession to achieve her ends.

Bombing the Sacred Timeline

After killing several teams of TVA Minutemen and stealing their reset charges, Sylvie is tracked down by an alternate version of herself during a hurricane in 2050 Alabama, where, upon rejecting his offer to work together to overthrow the Time-Keepers and revealing herself to him, she executes her scheme; teleporting the charges she stole to various locations in time, "bombing" the Sacred Timeline and sending the timeline into chaos to distract the TVA so that she can assassinate the Time-Keepers. She teleports away to the TVA via a Time Door, and Loki follows her.

Lamentis-1 and bonding with Loki

At the TVA's headquarters, Sylvie and Loki are confronted by Renslayer. As Sylvie threatens to kill Loki, Loki uses a TemPad to teleport them to the moon Lamentis-1 in 2077 while it is being destroyed by a falling planet. After Loki accidentally breaks the TemPad, Sylvie and Loki join forces to escape the moon, masquerading as a guard and his prisoner to get onto an evacuation train, where Sylvie and Loki bond over drinks and the differences in their pasts. After being discovered and thrown off the train, Sylvie and Loki plan to hijack the evacuation ship, which according to the "Sacred Timeline" will be destroyed before leaving the moon, only to fail. Loki learns from Sylvie that everyone in the TVA are variants hunting other variants, to which Loki reveals to Sylvie that the majority of variants working for the TVA, including Mobius M. Mobius and Hunter B-15, are unaware that they themselves are variants.

Confronting the Time-Keepers

With the TemPad broken, Sylvie and Loki come to peace at their impending deaths. After the pair form a romantic bond which spawns a Nexus Event perpendicular to the Sacred Timeline, they are arrested by the TVA, with Hunter B-15 secretly taking Sylvie to RoxxCart in 2050 to learn the truth about herself and her life before the TVA. Loki and Sylvie are taken to the Time-Keepers, accompanied by Renslayer and a group of Minutemen. Hunter B-15 intervenes, freeing them of their collars, and in the ensuing fight, the Minutemen are killed whilst Renslayer is knocked unconscious by Sylvie. Sylvie then beheads one of the Time-Keepers, who turn out to all be androids. Renslayer regains her consciousness and erases Loki from existence just as he prepares to tell Sylvie about his feelings for her.

The Void

Sylvie demands the truth from Renslayer, who is just as unaware of the creation of the TVA as she is. Telling her that Loki was not killed but sent to the Void at the End of Time when he was pruned, she deduces that whoever beyond the Void is the actual creator of the TVA. She prunes herself and reunites with Mobius, who takes her to Loki and other Loki variants in order to make a plan to escape Alioth, a monstrous cloud-like entity which consumes matter. She and Loki combine their powers to enchant Alioth while Classic Loki buys time by distracting the creature, sacrificing himself in the process. Loki and Sylvie successfully subdue Alioth and move past the Void. Noticing a citadel in the distance, the pair walk towards it.

Confronting He Who Remains

Upon entering the Citadel at the End of Time, Loki and Sylvie encounter Miss Minutes, who was directly created by the TVA's creator. She offers them a chance to escape by arranging a deal that would allow them to be placed back on the timeline and live a life where all their desires are fulfilled. They decline her offer, realizing that is destiny that brought them to the end of time. They meet the real creator of the TVA, a man named "He Who Remains" who cannot be killed by Sylvie's efforts because he knows everything that will happen in the future. He reveals the true history of the TVA and it ended the multiversal war waged by his variants. Loki and Sylvie fight over whether to kill He Who Remains, who has no knowledge of what is about to happen after a certain point. Though she kisses him and acknowledges their connection, Sylvie sends him to a version of the TVA Headquarters through a TemPad. In order to enact vengeance for all the suffering the TVA brought upon her and believing He Who Remains to be feinting them, Sylvie kills the man, who tells her that he would "see her soon". Realizing that He Who Remains was not lying about the origins of the TVA, she watches in anguish as many timelines branch and a Multiverse is created.

Appearance
Di Martino, Herron, costume designer Christine Wada and hair designer Amy Wood designed her look to be as practical as possible while acknowledging the character's life being a "dirty job" so as to stray away from stereotypical feminine costumes in film such as high heels. The look was meant to reflect that "this character [being] on the run... [is] not a comfortable existence" according to Di Martino and exhibited that through her initial disheveled appearance. Her helmet's broken horn was inspired by Lady Loki's headpiece in the comics and to show how rowdy her life prior to meeting Loki was, and how she is practically "broken" inside. Due to Di Martino's pregnancy while shooting, her costume was altered with hidden zippers so that she could nurse her baby between takes. Of this, Martino said: "Little (big) things like this that made it possible for me to do my job & be a parent...[I'm] forever grateful" and that '...it was just the little things and it's just saved a lot of time. Practically, it was a godsend."

Screen Rant found that despite previous issues in the MCU with uncomfortable costumes or unnecessary sexualization, coming to the conclusion that "wearing revealing outfits while fighting crime just doesn't make sense, and it's good that Marvel acknowledges that [this] is a great start, so it appears the studio is at least trying to save its heroes from bad costumes". To make her appearance match that of the life she lived prior to meeting Loki, she and Hiddleston found ways to incorporate her native accent so as to contrast with Loki's while keeping the Asgardian accent. Di Martino said of this, "Little things like keeping more of my regional accent, and not trying to sound too posh or too well spoken [were incorporated] because it just wouldn't suit the experience that Sylvie's had."

Reception

Critical response 
The character was received positively among critics and fans despite initial misgivings due to confusion over her identity. In a review for "Lamentis", Nola Pfau took note of how "Sylvie has given up a lot on this path...her insistence on not being called a Loki is interesting" adding that it paints "the picture of a person who knows herself, despite what or who others may think she is...she has had to fight just to live as herself" and called her tragic but also likable. Writing for IGN, Simon Cardy found that Di Martino "play[ed the role] beautifully, bringing a touching sense of humanity" in a scene between her and Hiddleston in "Journey into Mystery". Lauren Puckett-Pope of Elle said of the character: "Sylvie, like the love for which she waxes poetic, is complicated." With respect to the Loki variant, Sylvie, from the Loki TV series, Empire considered the character "an instant new favourite". Times Eliana Dockterman deemed Sylvie a "nuanced and compelling" character, adding that "it will be a real bummer if everything that goes wrong in the MCU for the next decade will be 'Sylvie's fault'", per her actions in the Loki episode "For All Time. Always.". For Simon Cardy of IGN, Sylvie's choices in the mentioned episode "makes complete sense for her character development," while for Rolling Stone she was driven by revenge. Brady Langmann of Esquire opined that Di Martino's turn as Sylvie "has already blown far past many of Marvel's depictions of women."

The character was also popular among fans, with Di Martino being number one on IMDb's "STARmeter" during season one's airing. Screen Rant found that this was "a real testament to how Marvel can cast a relatively unknown actor and launch them into immediate stardom by way of the MCU". Deseret News found Sylvie to be the "MVP" of the show because of how she "did more than any other character in this show" and how the character "drove most of the story. She was the one who wanted to bring down the Time Variance Authority and end the Sacred Timeline. She wanted to create free will. And she got all of that done."

Relationship with Loki 
Some criticized the show for Loki and Sylvie's relationship, dubbing it as "selfcest" despite Waldron feeling it a necessary addition to the show in order to further their character development and self-love. BBC Culture critic Stephen Kelly called the relationship "some of the most perverse fan fiction the internet has ever seen" when speculating on the future of the show in a review for "The Variant". Christian P. Haines, a philosopher and assistant English professor at Penn State University, discussed with Gizmodo the implications of the romance, stating that "the question is less, 'does this count as incest', and more 'what would happen if this really basic social rule were loosened?...Would chaos roil the multiverse? Or, would things be pretty much the same, except we wouldn't take for granted even the most basic social and cultural rules? That strikes me as a very Loki proposition: not revolution, really, more an acerbic irony that undermines self-serious assumptions about human nature or what it means to be 'civilized.' " Haines found issue with the way people "get excited by the transgression this represents" but heaped praise on the exploration of self the show presented. Andi Ortiz of TheWrap found the relationship to be "a little hard to make it work long term" but praised it as a whole with note to Hiddleston and Di Martino's performances as making it work: "Loki and Sylvie have...been through a lot... they shared secrets and bared their souls to one another. And clearly, Tom Hiddleston and Sophia Di Martino have the right chemistry as actors."

Accolades

Future
On Sylvie's potential return in the second season of Loki, Di Martino said in July 2021 that she was aware of "rumors" but had not "heard officially if it's happening". In 2022, Tom Hiddleston stated that the "whole cast" will be returning for season two.

See also
 Characters of the Marvel Cinematic Universe
 Loki (Marvel Comics)
 Norse mythology in popular culture

References

External links
 Sylvie at the Marvel Cinematic Universe Wiki
 

Female characters in television
Fictional LGBT characters in television
Fictional bisexual females
Fictional characters from parallel universes
Fictional characters who use magic
Fictional characters with slowed ageing
Fictional characters with superhuman durability or invulnerability
Fictional goddesses
Fictional illusionists
Fictional impostors
Fictional knife-fighters
Fictional murderers
Fictional outlaws
Fictional princesses
Fictional terrorists
Fictional tricksters
Fictional women soldiers and warriors
Loki (TV series)
Marvel Cinematic Universe original characters
Marvel Comics Asgardians
Marvel Comics LGBT supervillains
Marvel Comics characters who use magic
Marvel Comics characters with accelerated healing
Marvel Comics characters with superhuman strength
Marvel Comics extraterrestrial supervillains
Marvel Comics giants
Marvel Comics female superheroes
Marvel Comics female supervillains
Norse mythology in popular culture
Orphan characters in television
Television characters introduced in 2021
Time travelers